Mehmet Ismail Shehu (January 10, 1913 – December 18, 1981) was an Albanian communist politician who served as the 23rd Prime Minister of Albania from 1954 to 1981. 

In 1938, he joined the International Brigades in Spain and fought as an officer in the 4th Battalion of the Italian Garibaldi Brigade. A member of the Spanish Communist Party, he moved to France after Franco's victory and was interned there from 1939 to 1942. He was handed over by the Vichy government to the fascists who sent him to Tirana. He left the company of his escort and joined the maquis and the Albanian Communist Party. Commander of the 1st Brigade of the National Liberation Army since 1943, Mehmet Shehu organized the liberation of Tirana on November 8, 1944.

As an acknowledged military tactician, without whose leadership the communist partisans may well have failed in their battle to win Albania for the Marxist-Leninist cause, Shehu exhibited an ideological understanding and work ethic that singled him out for rapid promotion in the communist party.

Mehmet Shehu shared power with Enver Hoxha from the end of the Second World War. According to official Albanian government sources, he committed suicide on December 18, 1981, after which his family was arrested. Persistent rumors remain, however, that Shehu was actually murdered on orders from Hoxha.

Early years 
Shehu was born in Çorrush, Mallakastër District, southern Albania, in the family of a Tosk Muslim Imam.  

Shehu graduated in 1932 at the Tirana Albanian Vocational High School funded by the American Red Cross. His focus was on agriculture. Unsuccessful in finding employment within the Ministry of Agriculture he managed to get a scholarship to attend the Nunziatella military academy of Naples, Italy. After being expelled from this school for his pro-Communist sympathies in 1936 he gained entry to the Tirana Officers School, but he left the following year after volunteering to fight for the republican side in the Spanish Civil War. He joined the Communist Party of Spain and was a machine-gunner who rose to the command of the Fourth Battalion of the XIIth Garibaldi Brigade. After the defeat of the Republican forces he was arrested in France in early 1939 as he was retreating from Spain along with his friends. He was imprisoned in an internment camp in France and later was transferred to an Italian internment camp, where he joined the Italian Communist Party.

Activity in World War II 

In 1942, he returned to Albania under Italian occupation, where he immediately joined the Albanian Communist Party and the Albanian resistance in Mallakastra. In 1943, he was elected as a candidate member of the Central Committee of the Communist Party. In August 1943, due to his military experience, he rose swiftly to commander of the 1st Partisan Assault Brigade. Thereafter, he was the commander of 1st Partisan Assault Division of the National Liberation Army. From 1944 to 1945 he was a member of the Anti-Fascist Council of National Liberation (the provisional government).

After WWII 

After Albania was liberated from the German occupation in November 1944, Shehu became the deputy chief of the general staff and, after he studied in Moscow, became the chief of the general staff. Later, he was also a lieutenant general and a full general.

In 1948, Shehu "expurgated" from the party the element who "tried to separate Albania from the Soviet Union and lead her under Belgrade's influence". This made him the nearest person to Enver Hoxha and brought him high offices. After the purge of Koçi Xoxe, he took over the Ministry of Internal Affairs. However, he remained in Hoxha's shadow.

From 1948, he was a member of the Central Committee and the Politburo of the Party of Labour of Albania, and, from 1948 to 1953, he was a secretary of the Central Committee. He lost the latter position on June 24 when Enver Hoxha gave up the posts of Minister of Defence and Minister of Foreign Affairs while retaining the premiership. Hoxha was probably not willing to yield too much power to him. From 1948 to 1954 he was deputy prime minister (deputy chairman of the Council of Ministers) and Minister of Internal Affairs.  The latter post made him commander of the secret police, the Sigurimi. In 1954, he succeeded Hoxha as Prime Minister. From 1974 he was also the Minister of People's Defence while from 1947 to his death he was a deputy of the People's Assembly.

Hard line man 
During the war, Shehu won a reputation for brutality. Mike Burke, the American spymaster who set up a 1950 paramilitary project to destabilize and oust the Albanian government, said in 1986 that Shehu was "one tough son of a bitch", whose security forces gave U.S. agents "a tough time".

During the discussion at the Meeting of 81 Communist and Workers' Parties in November 1960, Nikita Khrushchev asked Shehu if he had any criticisms of Joseph Stalin, to which Shehu replied: "Yes, not getting rid of you!"

Last years 
Shehu was considered Enver Hoxha's right-hand man and the second most powerful man in Albania. For 40 years Hoxha was Shehu's friend and closest comrade. On his 50th birthday in 1963, Hoxha honored Shehu with his name being attached to the local military-political academy, becoming the "Mehmet Shehu Military Academy". Shehu was one of those who prepared the Chinese-Albanian alliance and the break with the Soviet Union (December 1961). His relationship with Hoxha was damaged, however, when his son married a woman who had anti-Communist relations in the United States. This led to a meeting of the Politburo regarding his future.

On December 17, 1981, he was found dead in his bedroom in Tirana with a bullet wound to his head. According to the official announcement on Radio Tirana, he committed suicide in a nervous breakdown.

After his death, Shehu was claimed to have been a spy not only for Yugoslavia, but also the CIA and the KGB. This was substantiated by a CIA document obtained by Pirro Andoni, then the country's ambassador to Argentina, in which they outline a plan for Mehmet Shehu to assassinate Enver Hoxha, take control of the Party of Labour of Albania, and open up to the West. In Hoxha's book The Titoites (1982) several chapters are dedicated to Shehu's denunciation. In 1982, the Party of Labour issued a second edition of its official history, removing all references to Shehu. 

Reportedly, Shehu had begun speaking out against Hoxha's isolationism. He had reached out to some western nations like Italy, the United Kingdom and Germany to see about making diplomatic ties. Albanians speculated that Hoxha, who was in the last years of his life, wanted to secure his legacy and did not want a successor who might outshine him. He was branded as a “people’s enemy” and was buried in a wasteland near the village of Ndroq near Tirana. 

Shehu’s family was also punished. His widow, Fiqerete, (born Sanxhaktari) and two of his sons were arrested without any explanation and later imprisoned on different pretexts. One son committed suicide and his wife died in prison in 1988. One of Shehu's surviving sons later launched a campaign to prove that his father had, in fact, been murdered. After the fall of Communism and his release from prison in 1991, Mehmet Shehu's younger son Bashkim started seeking his father's remains. On November 19, 2001, it was announced that Mehmet Shehu's remains had been found.

A fictionalised account of Mehmet Shehu's fall and death is the subject of  Ismail Kadare's novel The Successor (2003).

See also 
 History of Albania

References

Bibliography
Shehu, Duro. Mehmet Shehu: Im vëlla, Tirana, Bota Shqiptare: 2008.

1913 births
1981 deaths
People from Mallakastër
Albanian former Muslims
Albanian atheists
Labour Party of Albania politicians
Members of the Politburo of the Labour Party of Albania
Members of the Parliament of Albania
Government ministers of Albania
Prime Ministers of Albania
Deputy Prime Ministers of Albania
Defence ministers of Albania
Albanian generals
Anti-revisionists
Albanian people of the Spanish Civil War
International Brigades personnel
Albanian resistance members
Albanian people of World War II
People's Socialist Republic of Albania
Albanian politicians who committed suicide
Suicides by firearm in Albania